Thornhill Hall is a ruined medieval manor house on a moated island located in Rectory Park, Thornhill, West Yorkshire, England. The ruins are listed as grade II. and the moat, with the surrounding grounds, is a scheduled monument.

Excavations carried out between 1964 and 1972 proved that there had been two halls on the island, an earlier large 13th-century building with clay-bonded foundation walls, and a later c. 1450 stone H-plan building. The later building showed signs of renovation in the 16th century, when a paved floor, plaster walls and a chimney were added.

History

In the reign of Henry III, Thornhill Hall was the seat of the Thornhill family, who intermarried with the De Fixbys and Babthorpes in the reigns of Edward I and Edward II. In 1370, in the reign of Edward III, Elizabeth Thornhill, the only child of Simon Thornhill, married Sir Henry Savile. This extinguished the family line of Thornhills of Thornhill which now passed down the Savile line. Thornhill Hall then became the principal seat of the powerful Savile family. 

The Saviles later intermarried with the Calverley family, so that when Sir John Savile died in 1503 in Thornhill, he left provision in his will for his sister Alice, who had married Sir William Calverley.

George Savile was created a baronet in 1611. The Saviles remained here until the English Civil War when in  1643 the house was besieged by the forces of Parliament, (having been previously fortified by Sir William Savile, the third baronet of the family).  In August 1643 troops of Lady Anne Savile, under Capt. Thos. Paulden defended the hall against the Parliamentary forces under Col. Sir Thos. Fairfax. They were forced to surrender but the hall was accidentally blown up and destroyed. after which the family moved their seat to Rufford Abbey in Nottinghamshire.

Some ruins of the house and the moat still remain at Thornhill Rectory Park. This large house had a secret underground passage, that lead to Thornhill Parish Church.  just a few hundred yards away from the park. The passage remained until the early 1990s when it was filled in due to safety reasons.

Recent events
The Heritage Lottery Fund awarded a grant to the architectural study of the ruins in the summer of 2011.

Images of the ruined Hall
Part of ruined wall 
Chimney stack

Sources
 Nuttall, Barbara, History of Thornhill and A Guide to the Church of St. Michael and All Angels Published by Kirklees Cultural Services and Thornhill Parish Church. , 3rd edition, 1995.
 Nuttall, Barbara the Saviles of Thornhill- Life at Thornhill Hall in the reign of Charles I. Published by the Author 1986.
 Cathcart King, David James (1983), Castellarium Anglicanum: An Index and Bibliography of the Castles in England, Wales and the Islands. Volume II: Norfolk–Yorkshire and the Islands, London: Kraus International Publications,  (page 532)

References

External links

  Friends of Rectory Park Website
  West Yorkshire Archaeology Service Website, Thornhill page
  English Heritage Pastscape page

Ruins in West Yorkshire
Grade II listed buildings in West Yorkshire
Scheduled monuments in West Yorkshire